The Album is the 31st studio album by British singer Cliff Richard. It was released in 1993 by EMI Records and features five UK top 40 hit singles; "I Still Believe in You" (UK No. 7), "Peace in Our Time" (UK No. 8), "Human Work of Art" (UK No. 24), "Never Let Go" (UK No. 32) and "Healing Love" (UK No. 19). The Album  peaked at number one on the UK Albums Chart, becoming Richard's first non-compilation or non-film soundtrack album to reach the top spot since 21 Today in 1961.

Track listing
"Peace in Our Time" (Peter Sinfield, Andy Hill) – 5:46
"Love Is the Strongest Emotion" (Mick Leeson, Peter Vale) – 4:12
"I Still Believe in You" (David Pomeranz, Dean Pitchford) – 3:43
"Love's Salvation" (Cliff Richard, Paul Moessl) – 4:12
"Only Angel" (Barry Williams) – 5:30
"Handle My Heart with Love" (John Daniels, Phil Thomson) – 4:24
"Little Mistreater" (John Wilson, Alan Gorrie, Steve Pigott) – 3:55
"You Move Heaven" (Moessl, Steve Glen) – 4:18
"I Need Love" (Wilson) – 3:44
"Hold Us Together" (Richard, Moessl) – 4:45
"Human Work of Art" (Leeson, Vale) – 4:38
"Never Let Go" (Wilson, Gorrie) – 4:08
"Healing Love" (Nik Kershaw, Dennis Morgan) – 5:01
"Brother to Brother" (Moessl, Glen) – 4:24

Charts

Weekly charts

Year-end charts

Certifications

References

1993 albums
Cliff Richard albums
EMI Records albums